Darren Watson may refer to:
 Darren Watson (musician), a New Zealand singer, songwriter and guitarist
 Darren Watson (footballer) (b. 2003), a Scottish professional footballer